A 3 Minute Hug is a 2019 documentary film directed and written by Everardo González. The premise revolves around the event that took place in May 2018 when the event “Hugs Not Walls” took place, organized by the Border Network For Human Rights. On this event, people from both sides of a dry embankment along the Rio Grande who are usually separated get a few minutes to reunite.

Release
A 3 Minute Hug was released on October 28, 2019, on Netflix.

References

External links
 
 

2019 documentary films
2019 films
Netflix original documentary films